Reidun Andreassen  (born 15 June 1936) is a Norwegian politician.

She was born in Oslo to Arne Throndsen and Agnes Otilie Bakke. She was elected representative to the Storting for the period 1985–1989 for the Labour Party.

References

1936 births
Living people
Politicians from Oslo
Labour Party (Norway) politicians
Members of the Storting